In geometric topology, the dogbone space,  constructed by  , is a quotient space of three-dimensional Euclidean space  such that all inverse images of points are points or tame arcs, yet it is not homeomorphic to .

Although the dogbone space is not a manifold, it is a generalized homological manifold and a homotopy manifold.

See also 

 List of topologies

References

Geometric topology
Topological spaces